Bolitoglossa tatamae is a species of salamander in the family Plethodontidae.

It is endemic to Colombia.
Its natural habitat includes montane humid forests.
It is threatened by habitat loss.

References

tatamae
Endemic fauna of Colombia
Amphibians of Colombia
Amphibians described in 2006